Norton is an unincorporated community in Saline County, in the U.S. state of Missouri.

History
Norton was platted in 1878, and named after Elijah Hise Norton, a judge of the Supreme Court of Missouri. A post office called Norton was established in 1879, and remained in operation until 1954.

References

Unincorporated communities in Saline County, Missouri
Unincorporated communities in Missouri